"If Only" is a song written and performed by American pop rock band Hanson. It was released outside the United States on April 3, 2000, as the lead single from the band's second studio album, This Time Around (2000). Featuring John Popper of the band Blues Traveler on harmonica, the song reached the top 10 in Australia, Finland, Italy, and Spain.

Music video
The music video features the group traveling in a desert on their tour bus, unloading their equipment to shoot the video.

Track listings
All songs were written by Isaac Hanson, Taylor Hanson, and Zac Hanson.

UK CD single
 "If Only" (radio edit) – 4:04
 "If Only" (JFP Club Mix) – 5:58
 "Smile" – 3:16
 "If Only" (video) – 3:58

UK cassette single
 "If Only" (radio edit) – 4:04
 "MMMBop" (live from Albertane) – 4:11

European CD single
 "If Only" (radio edit) – 3:59
 "If Only" (JFP Club Mix) – 5:58

European digipak single
 "If Only" (radio edit) – 3:59
 "If Only" (LP version) – 4:30
 "Look at You" (live from Albertane) – 4:21
 "This Time Around" / "Runaway Run" / "In the City" (album snippets) – 2:40

Australian maxi-CD single
 "If Only" (radio edit) – 3:59
 "If Only" (album version) – 4:30
 "I Don't Know" – 4:17
 "If Only" (UK radio mix) – 4:04
 "If Only" (video – enhanced)

Personnel
Personnel are adapted from the European CD single liner notes.
 Isaac Hanson – vocals, electric guitar, acoustic guitar
 Taylor Hanson – vocals, piano, organ, percussion, harmonica
 Zac Hanson – vocals, drums
 John Popper – harmonica

Charts

Certifications

References

2000 singles
2000 songs
Hanson (band) songs
Island Records singles
Mercury Records singles
Songs written by Isaac Hanson
Songs written by Taylor Hanson
Songs written by Zac Hanson